The West Kalimantan Council is the unicameral legislature of the Indonesian province of West Kalimantan. The Council is composed of 65 members elected via party lists in the 2014 legislative election. Elections are held every five years and are conducted simultaneously with the nationwide legislative election.

It convenes in the Gedung DPRD Kalimantan Barat, South East Pontianak District, Pontianak City.

Composition

Speaker and Deputy Speakers 
 Speaker: M. Kebing L. (PDI-P)
 Deputy Speakers
 Deputy Speaker 1: Suma Jenny Heryanti (Golkar)
 Deputy Speaker 2: Ermin Elviani (Demokrat)
 Deputy Speaker 3: H. Suriansyah (Gerindra)

References

External links 
Official website

Unicameral legislatures
Provincial assemblies of Indonesia
West Kalimantan